Kolmer is a German-language surname from a status name originally denoting a yeoman according to Kulm law. It may refer to:
Eva Schmidt-Kolmer (1913–1991), Austrian-German physician
Felix Kolmer (1922–2022), Czech physicist, specialising in the field of acoustics

References 

German-language surnames
Surnames from status names